The 2008–09 season of the Moroccan Throne Cup was the 53rd edition of the competition. It began on 22 November 2008.

The cup was won by FAR de Rabat, who beat Fath Union Sport in the final.

3rd round

4th Round

5th Round 
This round saw the entry of teams from the GNF 2. The draw was made on Wednesday 25 February 2009.

Last 32 
This round saw the entrance of clubs from Botola. The draw was made on Thursday 26 March 2009.

Last 16 
The draw took place on Tuesday 14 April 2009.

Quarter-finals 
The draw took place on Tuesday 23 June 2009.

Semi-finals 
The draw took place on Tuesday 23 June 2009.

Final

See also 

2008–09 Botola

External links 
  Site of the FRMF
  Match results

2008
2008–09 in Moroccan football